Kira Plastinina is a Russian fashion designer and entrepreneur. Her brand was sold through a now defunct chain of eponymous retail stores in Russia, Ukraine, Kazakhstan, Belarus, China, Philippines and Armenia.

Plastinina was born in Moscow. Her father, Sergei Plastinin, founded Wimm-Bill-Dann Foods OJSC in 1992 and served as its Chief Executive Officer until April 3, 2006. In 2007, the first Kira Plastinina store opened in Moscow, Plastinina introduced her first collection and became one of the youngest fashion designers in the world. Since then, the company has opened over 300 stores in Russia and CIS. In 2008, the company made an unsuccessful attempt to enter the U.S. market. The U.S. entity eventually filed for bankruptcy.

Throughout her career, Plastinina has presented her fashion collections during Rome, Milan, New York and Moscow fashion weeks. Her brand has been worn by many celebrities including Paris Hilton, Lindsay Lohan, Georgia May Jagger, Karlie Kloss, Rowan Blanchard, Lyndsy Fonseca, Victoria Justice, and many others. Plastinina is close friends with Debby Ryan.

Social boycott 

"Kira Plastinina" shop chain became an object of Russian products boycott in the aftermath of the Russian annexation of Crimea.

References

External links
Official website
Teenage Fashion Designer Kira Plastinina
Teen Vogue Article

1992 births
Living people
Russian fashion designers
Russian women fashion designers
Russian expatriates in the United States
Columbia Business School alumni